Trough may refer to:

In science
 Trough (geology), a long depression less steep than a trench
 Trough (meteorology),  an elongated region of low atmospheric pressure
 Trough (physics), the lowest point on a wave
 Trough level (medicine), the lowest concentration of a medicine is present in the body over time
 Langmuir-Blodgett trough, a laboratory instrument

In politics
 Trough (economics), the lowest turning point of a business cycle
 as metaphor for political corruption, in the contexts of crony capitalism, nepotism, and public economics

Other uses
 Bread trough or dough trough, rectangular receptacle with a shallow basin, used in breadmaking 
 Trough (food) or manger, a container for animal feed
 Watering trough, a receptacle of drinking water for domestic and non-domestic livestock
 Battle of the Trough, a 1756 skirmish of the French and Indian War in West Virginia
 Sleightholme Beck Gorge - The Troughs, a Site of Special Scientific Interest in the Teesdale district of south-west County Durham, England
 The Trough, a gorge carved by the South Branch Potomac River in West Virginia
 "Down the trough", as used by Donegal Gaelic football club Cill Chartha
 Trough, an old word for an inkwell

See also
 Trow, a type of cargo boat
 Troff, a document processing system developed by AT&T for the Unix operating system
 "Tropho-", a Greek root meaning to feed or grow
Trough urinal, a long urinal for many men